The 1898 Detroit College Tigers football team  was an American football team that represented Detroit College (renamed the University of Detroit in 1911) as an independent during the 1898 college football season. In its third season under head coach William S. Robinson, the team compiled a 5–0 record and outscored its opponents by a combined total of 91 to 12.  The team played games against Detroit School for Boys, Irvings, Detroit Alumni, Michigan Military Academy and Mount Clemens High School.

Schedule

References

Detroit College Tigers
Detroit Titans football seasons
College football undefeated seasons
Detroit College Tigers football
Detroit College Tigers football